Kili may refer to the following:


People
 Justin Kili (-2015), Papua New Guinean media personality, journalist, activist, and pioneer
 Kili Lefotu (born 1983), American football player

Places
 Kili, a nickname for Mount Kilimanjaro
 Kili, India, site of the Battle of Kili, a 1299 victory of the Delhi Sultanate over the Mongols
 Kili Island, in the Marshall Islands
 Kili Airport, on Kili Island

Other uses
 Kíli, a Dwarf from J. R. R. Tolkien's novel The Hobbit
 KILI, a radio station in Porcupine, South Dakota
 Kili language, a Tungusic language of Russia and China

See also 
 
 Kilis, a city in south-central Turkey, administrative centre of Kilis Province
 Kilis Province, south-central Turkey
 Kilis (electoral district)
 Emirate of Kilis, a medieval emirate
 Koili, a village near Paphos, Greece